Garjai (also Romanized as Garjā’ī and Gorjā’ī) is a village in Kamazan-e Vosta Rural District, Zand District, Malayer County, Hamadan Province, Iran. At the 2006 census, its population was 1,062, in 281 families.

References 

Populated places in Malayer County